Sabrina may refer to:

 Sabrina (given name), a feminine given name, including a list of persons and fictional characters with the name

People
 Sabrina (actress), stage name of Norma Ann Sykes (1936–2016), a British glamour model and actress
 Sabrina (Filipino singer) (born 1989)
 Sabrina (Greek singer) (born 1969)
 Sabrina (Portuguese singer) (born 1982)
 Sabrina Salerno (born 1968), Italian singer also mononymously known as Sabrina

Film and television
 Sabrina (1954 film), starring Humphrey Bogart, Audrey Hepburn, and William Holden
 Sabrina (1995 film), a remake starring Harrison Ford, Julia Ormond, and Greg Kinnear
 Sabrina (2018 film), an Indonesian horror film
 several media properties featuring Sabrina the Teenage Witch
 Sabrina (TV series), a Mexican show on the Telehit network, circa 2005
 Sabrina (Bangladeshi TV series), a streaming series

Music
 Sabrina (album), an album by Sabrina
 "Sabrina", a song by Einstürzende Neubauten
 "Sabrina", a song from Heartbeat of the Earth by Inkubus Sukkubus

Places
 Sabrina Coast, a part of the coast of Antarctica
 Sabrina Ridge, Antarctica
 Sabrina Island, off Antarctica
 Sabrina Island (Azores), a temporary island between June and July 1811
 Sabrina Way, a footpath and bridleway in England
 River Severn or Sabrina, a river in Great Britain
 Lake Sabrina, California, United States

Ships
 HMS Sabrina, the name of four ships of the Royal Navy
 MSC Sabrina, a container ship
 SS Sabrina or SS Empire Buckler, a Liberian cargo ship

Other uses
 Sabrina (comics), a 2018 graphic novel by Nick Drnaso
 2264 Sabrina, an asteroid
 Statue of Sabrina, an 1857 statue owned by Amherst College
 Senova D20, a 2012–present Chinese subcompact car, sold in Iran as the BAIC Sabrina

See also
 Sabina (disambiguation)